Gujarat riots may refer to any of the following riots in Gujarat, India:

 1969 Gujarat riots
 1985 Gujarat riots
 2002 Gujarat riots
 2006 Vadodara riots
 2015 Bharuch riots
 2017 Patan riots

See also
Parsi–Muslim riots, pre-independence riots in Gujarat and Bombay
1857 Bharuch riot